SBJD may refer to:
Jundiaí Airport (ICAO: SBJD), in Brazil
Sino-British Joint Declaration, a treaty signed in 1984